Silvana Di Lotti (born 29 November 1942) is an Italian composer. She was born in Aglie Canavese, Turin, and studied in Turin and Salzburg with Roberto Goitre and Amalia Pierangeli Mussato, and in Siena with Luciano Berio and Pierre Boulez. After completing her studies, she took a position teaching at the Turin Conservatory.

Works
Selected works include:
Woodland Flute Call for flute
A Medieval Minstrelsy , suite for pipe organ, voice and piano
Duo In Eco for violin and guitar

References

1942 births
Living people
20th-century classical composers
Italian music educators
Women classical composers
Italian classical composers
20th-century Italian composers
Women music educators
20th-century women composers